FC Dobrudzha is a Bulgarian football club based in Dobrich, that competes in the Second League, the second tier of Bulgarian football.

It plays its home matches at Stadion Druzhba with a capacity of 12,500 seats, and its team colours are green and yellow. The team is named after the Dobruja region, a prominent agricultural area in Northeast Bulgaria.

Honours
A PFG
 7th place: 1995–96
B PFG
  Winners (1): 1965–66
  Runners-up (2): 1990–91, 2001–02
Bulgarian Cup
 Semi-finalists: 1946, 1947, 1980

History

Dobrudzha was founded as a union of three clubs, Vihar, Orlov and Slavia, in 1916. The club assumed the names Cherveno zname, Spartak and Septemvri between 1949 and 1957, when it was renamed Dobrudzha after a few other local sport associations joined, and qualified for the A PFG in 1962, where it has remained a total of 14 non-continuous seasons, with the 7th place in 1995–96 being the best achievement. Dobrudja has also spent a total of 45 seasons in B PFG, which the team won in 1966. 

In 2001, the team managed to return to the top-flight. However, the team was relegated back after only one season. Since then, the team has been bouncing between the second and third tiers of Bulgarian football.

In 2018, Dobrudzha returned to the second tier by winning the 2017–18 Northeast Third League. The team, however, struggled in the second tier, finishing last. In the 2019–20 season, Dobrudzha once more finished first in the third tier, promoting again to the second tier after the season was finished early in March, due to the COVID-19 epidemic in Bulgaria.

Current squad

For recent transfers, see Transfers winter 2022-2023.

Statistics

League positions

Seasons
14 seasons in A PFG:

Best wins:

Notable persons
Players
Players with most matches played for the team in A PFG:

Players with most goals, scored in A PFG:

Former managers

  Iliya Iliev
  Petar Kirov
  Eduard Eranosyan
  Asen Milushev
  Petar Zhekov
  Hristo Milanov
  Kolyo Markov
  Yanko Dinkov
  Dimitar Aleksiev
  Vasil Velikov
  Ivan Manolov
  Boris Nikolov
  Stoyan Kotsev
  Ljubomir Veljković
  Dimcho Nenov
  Emil Velev
  Svetoslav Petrov 
  Atanas Atanasov-Orela
  Sasho Angelov

External links
 Official website
 DOBRUDJA1919.COM – Fansite
 Dobrudja1919.com/Gallery – Photo Gallery
 Facebook Fanpage
 DDFC1919 YouTube Channel

Association football clubs established in 1916
Football clubs in Bulgaria
 
PFC Dobrudzha Dobrich
PFC Dobrudzha Dobrich